Brinson is a surname. Notable people with the surname include:

Craig Brinson, boxer
Dana Brinson (born 1965), American football player
Gary P. Brinson, investor and founder of Brinson Partners, later head of UBS Asset Management
L. Catherine Brinson, American materials scientist
Lewis Brinson (born 1994), American baseball player
Linda Carter Brinson, journalist and editor
Samuel M. Brinson, politician